Woodlands Family Theme Park is an all-weather family amusement park and falconry display on the A3122 road, 5 miles from Dartmouth, in South Devon, England. It is part of Bendalls Leisure Ltd which also owns Twinlakes Theme Park and Wheelgate Park.

The falconry display has over 50 birds of prey. During the October half term the park hosts a Halloscream Week.

Designed by the Bendall family there are extensive play zones throughout the Park, each having a selection of rides and attractions enabling all the family to play together or enjoy play equipment designed to the guest’s abilities. The massive indoor playcentres at Woodlands are essential for guests to enjoy the highest standard of venture equipment, soft play and rides whatever the weather conditions.

History
The site was purchased by the Bendall family in 1971 as a 200-acre dairy farm and diversified in 1989 to a 90-acre leisure park and caravan park. It remains a family owned company, Bendalls Leisure Ltd. The layout, café, shop, buildings, play equipment and landscaping all designed by family Bendall members.

The first year that the park opened saw 60,000 visitors. The average annual Leisure Park visitor numbers are now around 350,000. The redevelopment of Woodlands over the years:

1996/7

 2nd Caravan Park (Falcons View) built and opened
 Installation of first indoor play complex, 1 million pounds

1999

 Installation of Tango Trolls Mystic Maze
 Arctic Gliders
 New roads and parking

2000

 Two million pounds spent on critical indoor attractions to build visitor numbers in wet weather, five levels of play equipment and rides: The Empire of the Sea Dragon.

2001

 New toilets and facilities
 New admission kiosks
 3rd Caravan Park (Wellpark) created
 Master Blaster Indoor Centre – replacing out dated equipment

2002

 Completed Wellpark Caravan Park
 New landscaping 
 Water zapping Bumper Boats
 – for under sevens
 Renewing parts of the Commando Course

2003-2006

 Rock ‘n’ Roll Tugboat installed
 Circus Train Ride –train for young children
 Avalanche Ride – huge drop water ride
 Big Top Playcentre – under fives
 Dune Buggy Ride – younger children
 Polar Pilot Ride – younger children
 Abbey Ruins ‘Archaeological Dig’
 Sand Diggers

2007

 Re-building of Zoo-Farm Complex

2008

 Installation of Swing Ship ride – white knuckle ride and Dolphin Toddler Play, relocation of Bumper Boats

2009

 Seascape Mirror Maze
 Play zone

2010

 Safari Adventure Golf and Mini Ninja Playtime

2012

 Dinosaur Farm Ride

2013

 Fantasy Forest - a mystical adventure attraction in the woods

2014

 Chicken & Pizza Parlour

2015

 Super Hero Theming and Mascot - ‘Unleash the Hero in You!’

2016

 DinoTrek, Jumping Pillow and Farmyard Ride

2017

 Vertigo 
 Father Christmas Grotto
2021

 Revamped Christmas Grotto Experience

Attractions 
The park comprises numerous playzones including: 3 Watercoasters, Toboggan run, Arctic Gliders, Avalanche, Pedal Boats, Bumper Boats, Tango Trolls Mystic Maze, Sand Diggers & Big Dig, Swing Ship Ride, Dolphin Toddlers Play, Ninja Towers, Seascape Mirror Maze, Whistle Stop Junction, Pedal Karts, Commando Course, Safari Adventure Golf and the indoor attractions Teddy Mountain, Masterblaster, Circusdrome & Empire of the Sea Dragon. Also, large Zoo Farm Complex and Indoor Falconry Centre.  More recent attractions are the Dinotrek, Jumping Pillow, Farmyard Ride and Vertigo.

In the recent years the Park has focused on the expansion of seasonal experiences for example the widely popular Christmas Grotto.

Location 
On the A3122, 5 miles from Dartmouth, South Devon. Set in 100 acres of great natural beauty, mostly in an ancient wooded valley. Containing three woodland lakes, Laura’s Wood Wildlife Sanctuary, outstanding landscaping and gardens.

Employees 
Approximately 60 permanent staff and 130 seasonal staff.

Awards 

 Membership to Best of British Quality Touring and Holiday Parks 
 'AA Quality Standard’ Rating of 5 Pennants, with a score of 92%
 AA Five Gold Pennant Award
 Practical Caravan Top 100 Parks Awards
 Motor Caravan and Caravan Your Top 101 Sites
 Five Stars in the ‘Loo of the Year Awards’
 Camping & Walking Magazine: Campsite of the Year.
 South Hams Tourism: South Hams for all Seasons 
 England for Excellence: Environmental last six.
 Nominated for Best Small Business by Countryside Commission.
 England for Excellence: Best Holiday Centre, last six.
 Good Guide to Britain: Traditional Family Outing of the Year.
 Good Guide to Britain: Top Attraction.

External links
http://www.woodlandspark.com official park site

Amusement parks in England
Tourist attractions in Devon
Amusement parks opened in 1989
Companies based in Devon
1989 establishments in England